AZ Electronic Materials is a specialty chemicals company. On 2 May 2014, Merck KGaA announced the successful acquisition of AZ Electronic Materials.

History
The Company was established in the 1950s as a division of Hoechst (now Sanofi). The name of the company is derived from the organic compound diazo. In 1997 it was acquired by Clariant, a Swiss specialty chemicals business and in 2004 it was bought with funds controlled by the Carlyle Group. Vestar Capital Partners took a stake in the company in 2007. In October 2010 it was first listed on the London Stock Exchange. On 2 May 2014, Merck KGaA announced the successful acquisition of AZ Electronic Materials.

Operations
The Company produces and sells specialty chemical materials used in the manufacture of integrated circuits and flat panel displays.

References

Merck Group
Chemical companies of the United Kingdom
Companies formerly listed on the London Stock Exchange
2014 mergers and acquisitions